State Highway 59 (SH 59) is a state highway that runs from Jacksboro to St. Jo in Texas.

History

The original SH 59 was designated on August 21, 1923, between Palacios and Midfield, replacing SH 19B. On April 26, 1926, the highway extended to the military camp west of Palacios. On November 15, 1927, the route extended south to Tivoli (though this section was originally designated but unnumbered on October 10, 1927). On February 22, 1928, the route extended south to Rockport, replacing part of SH 113. On March 19, 1928, this route was cancelled in exchange for extending SH 57 and rerouting SH 58.

On March 19, 1930, SH 59 was designated again between Bowie and Montague, with a proposed extension north to Nocona as a renumbering of SH 2F. On September 26, 1939, it was rerouted, so instead of going north from Montague to Nocona, it ran east from Montague to Saint Jo, replacing SH 175. The old route became new SH 175. On January 10, 1945, it was extended further south to near Jacksboro. On December 17, 1945, FM 454 from Bowie southwest 5 miles was cancelled and combined with SH 59. The final extension into Jacksboro was on October 1, 1968, over previous SH 24, which had been rerouted farther south.

Junction list

References

059
Transportation in Jack County, Texas
Transportation in Clay County, Texas
Transportation in Montague County, Texas